Peking Man were a 1980s New Zealand new wave band made up of Margaret and Pat Urlich, Tim Calder, Perry Marshall, Jan Foulkes, Neville Hall, John Fearon and Jay F-bula. The band had a number of hits in their homeland.

Discography

Studio albums

Singles

Awards

References

External links
 Room That Echoes music video, New Zealand on Screen
 Peking Man, New Zealand on Screen

APRA Award winners
New Zealand pop music groups
New Zealand new wave musical groups
Musical groups established in 1985
Musical groups disestablished in 1988
1985 establishments in New Zealand
1988 disestablishments in New Zealand